Kaspar [Clemens Eduard] Zumbusch (23 November 1830 – 27 September 1915), as of 1888 Ritter von Zumbusch (a nobiliary particle), was a German sculptor, born at Herzebrock, Westphalia, who became a pre-eminent sculptor of neo-Baroque monuments in Vienna.

He went at the age of eighteen to study in Munich. at first unsuccessfully at the Academy and then Polytechische Schule under Johann Halbig. He continued his studies in Rome.  He won the competition in 1866 for a monument to Maximilian II of Bavaria, for the Maximilianstraße, Munich (unveiled 1875). In 1873 he was called to Vienna as professor in the academy, a post he held until he was made Professor Emeritus in 1901. His most important works are a statue of Count Rumford, Munich; and the monuments to Prince August of Prussia (Bellevue Park, Berlin), Beethoven (1873-1880, Vienna), Maria Theresa (1887, Vienna), and to Emperor William I (1896, Wittekindsberg, Westphalia). Also in Vienna are his monuments to Count Radetzky (1891) and to Archduke Albrecht (1898-1899).

He also modeled many private funeral monuments, decorative works, and portrait busts, including one of Wagner.

He died in 1915 at Rimsting. His brother Julius Zumbusch was a sculptor and one of his sons Ludwig von Zumbusch was a graphic artist and painter. Another of his sons, Leo von Zumbusch was a dermatologist known for his contribution to the identification of generalized pustular psoriasis.

Among his pupils was the Friulian sculptor Alfonso Canciani.

References

External links
 

1830 births
1915 deaths
20th-century German sculptors
20th-century German male artists
19th-century German male artists
19th-century German sculptors
German male sculptors